El Aouana (Latin : Cavallo) is a town and commune in Jijel Province, Algeria. According to the 1998 census it has a population of 12,384. It is famous for the discovery of four Dolmen by the French.

References

Communes of Jijel Province
Jijel Province